Mujtaba Yousuf is an Indian cricketer. He made his Twenty20 debut for Jammu & Kashmir in the 2018–19 Syed Mushtaq Ali Trophy on 21 February 2019. He made his List A debut on 3 October 2019, for Jammu & Kashmir in the 2019–20 Vijay Hazare Trophy. He made his first-class debut on 12 February 2020, for Jammu and Kashmir in the 2019–20 Ranji Trophy.

References

External links
 

Year of birth missing (living people)
Living people
Indian cricketers
Jammu and Kashmir cricketers
Place of birth missing (living people)